Year 1093 (MXCIII) was a common year starting on Saturday (link will display the full calendar) of the Julian calendar.

Events 
 By place 

 Europe 
 April 13 –The Grand Prince of Kiev Vsevolod I Yaroslavich dies, after a 15-year reign. He is succeeded by Sviatopolk II, who is acknowledged by other princes as the senior son of Iziaslav I, and ascends the Kievan throne as ruler of the Kievan Rus'. His cousin Vladimir II, prince of Chernigov, becomes a bitter rival.
 May 26 – Battle of the Stugna River: The nomadic Cumans defeat a Kievan joint force led by the princes of Kievan Rus' at the Stuhna River in the valley near Trepol. Rostislav Vsevolodovich, prince of Pereyaslavl, drowns while fleeing the battle.
 September 22 – King Olaf III of Norway ("the Peaceful") dies after a 26-year reign. He is succeeded by his son Magnus Barefoot who is proclaimed ruler of Norway at the Borgarting (or the Thing), an assembly of lawspeakers, in the region of Viken.

 Britain 
 March 6 – Anselm, Italian Benedictine abbot and theologian, becomes archbishop of Canterbury in England, succeeding Lanfranc. The post of archbishop has been left vacant (since 1089) by King William II of England – so he can collect the church's income for himself.
 November 13 – Battle of Alnwick: King Malcolm III of Scotland invades Northumberland, but is killed by English forces under Earl Robert de Mowbray while besieging Alnwick Castle. He is succeeded by his brother Donald III ("the Fair") as ruler of Scotland.
 The Normans under Lord Robert Fitzhamon occupy southern Wales, constructing Cardiff and Pembroke Castles.

 By topic 

 Religion 
 April 8 – Construction of Winchester Cathedral in England by the Norman bishop Walkelin is completed.
 August 11 – Construction of Durham Cathedral in England begins, replacing the Saxon 'White Church'.

Births 
 January 16 – Isaac Komnenos, Byzantine co-ruler
 Ahmad Yasawi, Turkic poet and Sufi (d. 1166)
 Baldwin VII, count of Flanders (d. 1119)
 Conrad III, king of Italy and Germany (d. 1152)
 Demetrius I, king of Georgia (approximate date)
 Gerhoh of Reichersberg, German theologian (d. 1169)
 Grigor III, Armenian catholicos of Cilicia (d. 1166)
 Robert fitzEdith, English feudal lord (d. 1172)
 Sancho Alfónsez, Spanish nobleman (d. 1108)
 Simon of Hauteville, count of Sicily (d. 1105)
 Simon of Vermandois, French bishop (d. 1148)
 William III, count of Ponthieu (approximate date)

Deaths 
 February 1 – Abul Hasan Hankari, Abbasid scholar (b. 1018)
 April – Rhys ap Tewdwr, king of Deheubarth, killed in battle (b. 997)
 April 13 – Vsevolod I Yaroslavich, Grand Prince of Kiev (b. 1030)
 May 26 – Rostislav Vsevolodovich, prince of Pereyaslavl
 June 21 – Ja'far ibn Abdallah al-Muqtadi was an Abbasid prince, son of al-Muqtadi and Mah-i Mulk.
 July 10 – Ulrich of Zell, German Cluniac reformer (b. 1029)
 August 4 – Alan Rufus, Breton/Norman nobleman (approximate year)
 August 24 – Geoffrey Boterel, Breton nobleman, eldest brother of Alan Rufus
 August 29 – Hugh I, French nobleman and abbot (b. 1057)
 September 22 – Olaf III "the Peaceful", king of Norway
 October 13 – Robert I, Count of Flanders
 November 13 – Malcolm III, king of Scotland (b. 1031)
 November 16 – Margaret, queen of Scotland (b. 1045)
 Bertrand II, count of Provence (approximate date)
 Constance, queen of Castile and León (b. 1046)
 Gao, Chinese empress (Song dynasty) (b. 1032)
 Iestyn ap Gwrgant, king of Morgannwg (b. 1014)
 Kaoruko, Japanese empress consort (b. 1029)
 Odo V (or Eudes), count of Troyes and Meaux
 Tzachas, Seljuk general and usurper, killed
 Wang Shen, Chinese painter and poet

References